Turnalı is a village in the Sason District, Batman Province, Turkey. The village is populated by Arabs and had a population of 268 in 2021.

The hamlet of Taşburun is attached to the village.

References 

Villages in Sason District
Arab settlements in Batman Province